Ngapuna  is a suburb in eastern Rotorua in the Bay of Plenty Region of New Zealand's North Island.

The New Zealand Ministry for Culture and Heritage gives a translation of "the springs" for Ngāpuna.

The Rotorua Wastewater Treatment Plant is in Ngapuna.

Marae

The suburb has two marae.

Ngāpuna or Hurunga o te Rangi Marae and meeting house is a meeting place for the Ngāti Whakaue hapū of Ngāti Hurunga Te Rangi and Ngāti Taeotu, and the Tūhourangi hapū of Hurunga Te Rangi and Ngāti Kahu Upoko.

Hinemihi Marae and meeting house is a meeting place for the Tūhourangi hapū of Ngāti Hinemihi and Ngāti Tuohonoa), and the Ngāti Tarāwhai hapū of Ngāti Hinemihi. In October 2020, the Government committed $4,525,104 from the Provincial Growth Fund to upgrade the marae and nine other marae, creating an estimated 34 jobs.

Demographics

Ngapuna had a population of 357 at the 2018 New Zealand census, an increase of 72 people (25.3%) since the 2013 census, and an increase of 30 people (9.2%) since the 2006 census. There were 102 households, comprising 192 males and 165 females, giving a sex ratio of 1.16 males per female. The median age was 34.2 years (compared with 37.4 years nationally), with 84 people (23.5%) aged under 15 years, 69 (19.3%) aged 15 to 29, 165 (46.2%) aged 30 to 64, and 39 (10.9%) aged 65 or older.

Ethnicities were 23.5% European/Pākehā, 88.2% Māori, 3.4% Pacific peoples, and 4.2% Asian. People may identify with more than one ethnicity.

The percentage of people born overseas was 3.4, compared with 27.1% nationally.

Although some people chose not to answer the census's question about religious affiliation, 37.0% had no religion, 48.7% were Christian, 2.5% had Māori religious beliefs, 0.8% were Buddhist and 1.7% had other religions.

Of those at least 15 years old, 21 (7.7%) people had a bachelor's or higher degree, and 63 (23.1%) people had no formal qualifications. The median income was $23,800, compared with $31,800 nationally. 12 people (4.4%) earned over $70,000 compared to 17.2% nationally. The employment status of those at least 15 was that 141 (51.6%) people were employed full-time, 21 (7.7%) were part-time, and 30 (11.0%) were unemployed.

References

Suburbs of Rotorua
Populated places in the Bay of Plenty Region
Populated places on Lake Rotorua